A Modern Casanova (German: Der moderne Casanova) is a 1928 German silent romantic comedy film directed by Max Obal and Rudolf Walther-Fein and starring Harry Liedtke, María Corda and Ernö Verebes. It was shot at the Staaken Studios in Berlin. The film's art direction was by Botho Hoefer and Hans Minzloff.

Cast

References

External links

Films of the Weimar Republic
Films directed by Rudolf Walther-Fein
Films directed by Max Obal
German silent feature films
1928 romantic comedy films
German black-and-white films
German romantic comedy films
Silent romantic comedy films
1920s German films
Films shot at Staaken Studios